Kothawal Chavadi is a neighbourhood in Chennai, India. It is situated in the northern part of the city adjoining George Town, Chennai. Until 1996, Kothawal Chavadi housed Asia's largest fruit and vegetable market. The market has since been moved to Koyambedu.

Notes

References
 

Neighbourhoods in Chennai